Peapack is an active commuter railroad train station in the borough of Peapack–Gladstone, Somerset County, New Jersey. Located on Holland Avenue (County Route 661) in the Peapack section of the municipality, the station serves trains of New Jersey Transit's Gladstone Branch. 

Service in Peapack began on October 10, 1890 when trains started operating New Jersey West Line Railroad west from Bernardsville to Gladstone.

Station layout
The station has one track and one low-level asphalt side platform. It is located just off of Holland Avenue in the Peapack section of Peapack-Gladstone, New_Jersey with a gravel parking lot. The parking lot is maintained by NJ Transit. The station is not compliant with the Americans with Disabilities Act of 1990.

References

External links

NJ Transit Rail Operations stations
Former Delaware, Lackawanna and Western Railroad stations
Railway stations in the United States opened in 1890
1890 establishments in New Jersey